Shillinglaw is a surname. Notable people with the surname include:

Anthony Shillinglaw (born 1937), English cricketer
Bob Shillinglaw (born 1953), American lacrosse coach
Brian Shillinglaw (1939–2007), Scottish rugby union and rugby league footballer
David Shillinglaw (born 1982), British artist
Harold Shillinglaw (1927–2016), Australian rules footballer
John Shillinglaw (1831–1905), Australian public servant, author and historian
Kim Shillinglaw (born 1969), British media executive